Max Group is an Indian conglomerate headquartered in New Delhi, operating in the fields of life insurance, healthcare, hospitality, real estate and independent senior living. It was founded in 1985 by Analjit Singh.

Max Group companies include Max Healthcare, Max Life Insurance, Max Financial Services, Max Ventures and Industries, Max India, Max Specialty Films, Max Estates, and Antara Senior Living.

History
Max Group traces its origin to the company inherited by Analjit Singh in 1985, following the death of his father Bhai Mohan Singh, founder of pharmaceutical company Ranbaxy Laboratories. Then named Max India (same as that of the current publicly-listed Max Group company), it started life as a manufacturer of an active drug compound for penicillin. In 1993, the group ventured into telecommunications by forming a joint venture with Hutchison Asia Telecom Group, called Max Telecom. Max Telecom was later sold to Vodafone and became Vodafone India. The group shifted its focus from being a B2B to B2C company in 2000, by foraying into the fields of healthcare and life insurance. Max Life Insurance was founded in 2000, followed by Max Healthcare in 2001, and Max Bupa in 2008.

Structure
Three publicly listed holding companies fall under Max Group: Max Financial Services, Max Ventures and Industries and Max India. The three holding companies have their own separate subsidiaries. The structure is as follows:

Max India
Antara Senior Living (senior living)

Max Financial Services
Max Life Insurance

Max Ventures and Industries
Max Estates (commercial and residential projects)
Max Asset Services (real estate services)
Max Specialty Films (packaging films)
Max I. Limited (venture capital)

Governance and financials
The group is led by Analjit Singh and a board of directors. Each holding company under the group operates independently and has its own board of directors and shareholders. In 2019, the group posted revenues of $3.2 billion. .

References

External links
 

 
Conglomerate companies established in 1985
Indian brands
1985 establishments in Delhi
Companies based in New Delhi
Indian companies established in 1985